Arase Dam  is a rockfill dam located in Kagoshima Prefecture in Japan. The dam is used for irrigation. The catchment area of the dam is 7.9 km2. The dam impounds about 15  ha of land when full and can store 2580 thousand cubic meters of water. The construction of the dam was started on 1989 and completed in 2018.

See also
List of dams in Japan

References

Dams in Kagoshima Prefecture